The Goring Gap is the narrow valley, occupied by the River Thames, between the Chiltern Hills and the Berkshire Downs. The river here delimits Berkshire from Oxfordshire. The village of Goring, on the Oxfordshire side of the Thames, gives its name to the gap.

Formation

Half a million years ago the chalk hills mentioned formed a continuous escarpment, thus the Thames flowed northeastwards to reach the North Sea sharing the catchment of the Great Ouse. A headwater of the latter still comes within  of low-gradient Thames tributary the Cherwell in an almost flat landscape. During maxima of the recent ice ages, the plain of the lower course froze, leaving all of northern England covered in ice sheets. The sheets grew to reach a likely previous escape, an overflow via the deep valleys of the Bulbourne-Gade, upper Colne, Stort and Stour. The Thames was thus halted, in a lake submerging the plain of Oxford: a winter-frozen but summer-thawed type. This eventually became so high that it overtopped the escarpment and cut a new route through the chalk, creating the Goring Gap. 

Since the ice sheets receded, the Thames has continued its new course – that is, one through Berkshire, to soon meet the River Kennet which had already carved out the lower Thames valley.

Context and localities
The Goring Gap constricts the Thames, narrowing the otherwise broad valley. Downstream lower hills almost face each other at Henley-on-Thames. 

Steep hills rise southwards to Lardon Chase, the nearest section of the Berkshire Downs while the Chiltern Hills rise to the north. The twin villages of Goring and Streatley face each other at the heart of the gap. The Thames Path local section between Reading and Oxford, and the Ridgeway (local successor to the Icknield Way) cross the Thames here.

The Goring Gap forms an important communications and transportation corridor. Besides the river itself, which is now limited to navigation for leisure purposes, the gap accommodates the A329 road linking Reading and Oxford, along with the Great Western Main Line railway from London to Bristol and South Wales.

Gallery

References

External links

Landforms of Berkshire
Landforms of Oxfordshire
Geology of Oxfordshire
Geology of Berkshire
Transport in Berkshire
Transport in Oxfordshire
Chiltern Hills
Geography of the River Thames
Landforms of England